Omni Sight Seeing is a 1989 album by Haruomi Hosono.

Track listing 

1989 albums
Haruomi Hosono albums